The Formosan ferret-badger (Melogale subaurantiaca) is a mustelid species endemic to Taiwan.

Taxonomy 
It was formerly thought to be conspecific with the Chinese ferret-badger (M. moschata), but a 2019 genetic study found it to represent a distinct species, and the American Society of Mammalogists later reclassified it as a distinct species. However, many authorities like the IUCN Red List still consider it conspecific with M. moschata.

Distribution 
The species is endemic to the island of Taiwan.

Reproduction 
Male Formosan ferret-badgers produce sperm between the months of February and September, and mate with females between March and October. The species is thought to have a litter size of two, and breeds once a year.

Threats 
A 2015 study analyzing specimens of M. subaurantiaca collected between 2010-2013 found evidence of rabies in just under half of the sampled individuals, indicating that a rabies epidemic hit the species at some point prior to the study. This was the first time rabies had been detected on Taiwan since it was declared rabies-free in 1961. The species is now thought to be a reservoir species for the rabies virus on Taiwan, and as of 2019, it has become an epidemic in eastern Taiwan; however, epidemics in western and southern Taiwan had subsided by then. Aside from the threats posed to the species, there have been reports of spillover from the ferret-badgers to pets and humans. Vaccination will be necessary to serve as a barrier to the disease and prevent further spillover.

See also
 List of endemic species of Taiwan

References 

Melogale
Mammals of Taiwan
Endemic fauna of Taiwan
Taxa named by Robert Swinhoe
Mammals described in 1862